Zaharaddeen Bello (born 21 December 1997) is a Nigerian professional footballer who plays for Kano Pillars as a defender.

Zaharaddeen has represented Nigeria during the Nigeria U-17 World Cup, Nigeria U-20 World cup and Nigeria U23 World Cup national team.

References 

1997 births
Living people
Nigerian footballers
Nigeria youth international footballers
Kano Pillars F.C. players
Association football defenders